Patricia O’Connor (November 29, 1914 - July 8, 2003) was an American veterinarian.

O'Connor was born in New York City and grew up in Buffalo, New York with her mother and stepfather.  Between 1933 and 1934 she entered the University of Alabama. Then in 1935 she attended the veterinarian class at Cornell University and graduated in 1939.

After graduating she moved to Charleston, West Virginia, and worked at a private practice. While there she married her classmate John Lewis Halloran, Jr in 1940.  Then they moved to Staten Island, NY and both worked at John's father's vet clinic.  Patricia worked in the clinic and did house calls however she was never paid by her father-in-law, where-as her husband was.

Patricia became pregnant with their first child in 1941. Then became pregnant again in 1942, that same year in the fall, Patricia was hired by the Staten Island Zoo to work as a veterinarian.  She was only hired as a temporary veterinarian since the job was during World War II, there were no men available.  She figured she would be dismissed from her job as soon as the war ended, however they kept her as their main veterinarian for 28 years.

References 
“Women Veterinarians.” Animal Pet Doctor.
 Smith, Donald F. “Perspectives in Veterinary Medicine Women in Veterinary Medicine:Dr. Patricia O’Connor [Halloran], Cornell 1939.” Women in Veterinary Medicine: Dr. Patricia O’Connor [Halloran], Cornell 1939, Dr. Donald F. Smith, 7 Aug. 2003.
 O'Connor Memoriam - American Association of Zoo Veterinarians (AAZV), Ken Kawata, 2003.
 “Halloran, Patricia O'Connor.” Halloran, Patricia O'Connor - Social Networks and Archival Context.

1914 births
2003 deaths
American veterinarians
University of Alabama alumni
Cornell University College of Veterinary Medicine alumni